Richard Vaughan (c. 1665–1734) was a Tory Welsh politician who sat in the House of Commons for 33 years from 1701 to 1734.

 
Vaughan was the son of William Vaughan of Corsygedol and his wife Anne Nanney, daughter of Griffith Nanney of Nannau Hall, Llanfachreth, Merioneth. He entered Lincoln's Inn in 1686. In 1697 he inherited the estate at Corsygedol on the death of his brother. He was High Sheriff of Merionethshire in 1697–8 and High Sheriff of Carnarvonshire in 1699–1700. He married Margaret Lloyd, daughter of Sir Evan Lloyd of Bodidris, Denbighshire on 10 February 1701.

Vaughan was elected Member of Parliament for Merioneth In a by election on 29 April 1701 on the death of Hugh Nanney. He was a lifelong Tory, and did not vote in any of the recorded divisions after 1715. He was Constable of Harlech Castle from 1704 to 1716.

Vaughan appears to have dedicated much of his later life to supervising extensive improvements to his house and estate. He died 28 March 1734 and was buried at Llandwye, Merioneth. His eldest son William Vaughan succeeded him in the estate and constituency. His second son Evan was also later MP for Merioneth.

References

1660s births
1734 deaths
British MPs 1707–1708
British MPs 1708–1710
British MPs 1710–1713
British MPs 1713–1715
British MPs 1715–1722
British MPs 1722–1727
British MPs 1727–1734
Members of the Parliament of Great Britain for Welsh constituencies